The National Bank (TNB) is a financial institution in Palestine. It was born out of the merger of Al Rafah Microfinance Bank and the Arab Palestinian Investment Bank.

References

Banks of the State of Palestine